Tommy Doyle (born 3 March 1956 in Chicago, Illinois) is an Irish former Gaelic footballer who played for the Annascaul GAA club and at senior level for the Kerry county team in the 1970s and 1980s. He had a brief spell with the John Mitchels club in the early 1990s. Doyle was an army private at one time, and so had the nickname "Private". He now runs Kinsale Bay Food Company and lives in Cork.

Playing career

Inter-county
Doyle was a member of one of the most successful teams ever to play Gaelic football. He won seven All-Ireland Senior Football Championship medals with Kerry, and was captain of the team in 1986. He received three consecutive GAA All Stars Awards, in 1984, 1985 and 1986.

References

1956 births
Living people
All-Ireland-winning captains (football)
All Stars Awards winners (football)
American Gaelic footballers
Gaelic football backs
Gaelic football forwards
Irish Army soldiers
Annascaul Gaelic footballers
John Mitchels (Kerry) Gaelic footballers
Kerry inter-county Gaelic footballers
Sportspeople from Chicago
Winners of seven All-Ireland medals (Gaelic football)